Street Sounds Crucial Electro 2 is the second compilation album in a series and was released 1984 on the StreetSounds label. The album was released on LP and cassette and contains eight electro music and old school hip hop tracks mixed by D.J. Maurice Watson assisted by D.J. Noel Watson/Bunny Rock Inc.

Track listing

References

External links
 Street Sounds Crucial Electro 2 at Discogs

1984 compilation albums
Hip hop compilation albums
Electro compilation albums